The Intel Extreme Masters Season XVII – Rio Major 2022, also known as IEM Rio Major 2022 or Rio 2022, was the eighteenth Counter-Strike: Global Offensive Major Championship. It was held in Rio de Janeiro, Brazil, between October 31 and November 13, 2022. Outsiders won the Major, defeating Heroic in the grand final 2–0.

Background
The Major was originally scheduled to take place from May 11 to May 24, 2020. However, due to the COVID-19 pandemic, Valve and ESL postponed the Major to November. Because Valve usually sponsors two Majors per year, the delayed Major was to have a 2,000,000 prize pool, making it the largest prize pool in CS:GO Major history. In September 2020, Valve and ESL announced that the Major was canceled because of continued complications from the COVID-19 outbreak in Brazil. In January 2021, Valve announced that PGL Major Stockholm 2021 would be the next Major instead. 

On September 15, 2021, ESL published the 2022 ESL Pro Tour Road Map, announcing its intention to host a Major in Rio. On January 25, 2022, Dexerto reported that ESL was planning to host the second major of 2022 in Rio de Janeiro. ESL announced the Intel Extreme Masters Rio Major 2022 on May 24, 2022. This was the first ever Major hosted in Brazil, and tickets sold out in less than an hour.

The defending Major Champions were FaZe Clan, who won their first major championship at PGL Major Antwerp 2022. They were eliminated in the Legends Stage after their loss to Bad News Eagles.

Format

Map Pool 
 Dust II
 Mirage
 Inferno
 Nuke
 Ancient
 Overpass
 Vertigo

Teams 

 Legends

 FaZe Clan
 Natus Vincere
 Ninjas in Pyjamas
 ENCE
 Sprout
 Heroic
 Team Spirit
 Team Liquid

 Challengers

 OG
 Team Vitality
 Evil Geniuses
 Cloud9
 BIG Clan
 Bad News Eagles
 MOUZ
 9z Team

 Contenders

 Team GamerLegion
 Outsiders
 00 Nation
 Furia Esports
 Fnatic
 Imperial Esports
 IHC Esports
 Grayhound Gaming

Challengers Stage

Legends Stage

Champions Stage 
With eight teams remaining, the final stage of the Major is a single-elimination bracket, with all matches played as best-of-3 maps.

Bracket

Final standings
The final placings are shown below. In addition, the prize distribution, seed for the next major, roster, and coaches are shown. Each team's in-game leader is shown first.

Notes

References

External links 

 

2022 first-person shooter tournaments
Counter-Strike: Global Offensive Majors
ESL One Counter-Strike competitions